Statistics of League of Ireland in the 1955/1956 season.

Overview
It was contested by 12 teams, and St Patrick's Athletic won the championship.

Final classification

Results

Top scorers

Ireland
League of Ireland seasons
1955–56 in Republic of Ireland association football